Route 795 or Highway 795 may refer to:

Canada
 Alberta Highway 795
Saskatchewan Highway 795

United States
  Interstate 795 (disambiguation)
  Maryland Route 795
  Nevada State Route 795
  Ohio State Route 795
  Puerto Rico Highway 795